Eyerusalem Jiregna (born 1993) is an Ethiopian photographer. She is based in Addis Ababa and focuses on women doing non traditionally female jobs. She is known for her photos of the local women of Harar.

Jiregna attended university in the United States where she took a course on photography. She worked as a photojournalist when she returned to Ethiopia and started her own photography business. She also trained as a fashion designer. As a result, her work often focuses on fabric. Jiregna wants to portray Ethiopia as it is to the rest of the world. She has exhibited in Addis Fine Art Gallery.

Exhibitions
Photoville, 2016
Africa Contemporary African Art Fair, 2017
Investec Cape Town Art Fair, 2018
Refraction: New Photography of Africa and its Diaspora, Steven Kasher Gallery, New York City, 2018
FNB Joburg Art Fair, 2018

References

External links
The street photographers reframing Africa

1993 births
Ethiopian photographers
Ethiopian women photographers
Ethiopian journalists
Ethiopian women journalists
Ethiopian mass media people
Photojournalists
Living people
Women photojournalists